The 1967 Harelbeke–Antwerp–Harelbeke was the 10th edition of the E3 Harelbeke cycle race and was held on 25 March 1967. The race started and finished in Harelbeke. The race was won by Willy Bocklant.

General classification

Notes

References

1967 in Belgian sport
1967